The 1982 Oklahoma State Cowboys football team represented Oklahoma State University in the Big Eight Conference during the 1982 NCAA Division I-A football season. In their fourth season under head coach Jimmy Johnson, the Cowboys compiled a 4–5–2 record (3–2–2 against conference opponents), finished in third place in the conference, and were outscored by opponents by a combined total of 267 to 241.

The team's statistical leaders included Ernest Anderson with 1,877 rushing yards ( nation’s leader),  Ike Jackson with 1,254 passing yards, Terry Young with 507 receiving yards, and placekicker Larry Roach with 65 points scored.

The team played its home games at Lewis Field in Stillwater, Oklahoma.

Schedule

After the season

The 1983 NFL Draft was held on April 26–27, 1983. The following Cowboys were selected.

References

Oklahoma State
Oklahoma State Cowboys football seasons
Oklahoma State Cowboys football